Wae's me for Prince Charlie is Battlefield Band's second (studio) album on the Escalibur label. It was first released on LP in 1978 as Volume II - Wae's me for Prince Charlie.

Content
The album is a sort of "follow-up" to Volume I - Farewell to Nova Scotia which had been previously released on LP in 1976 as Battlefield Band's debut (studio) album on the Escalibur label.

Track listing

Side A : 19:49
 "Pipe Major George Allan" 4.55 (Donald MacLeod)
 "Wae's Me for Prince Charlie" (*) 4.05 (William Glen)
 "Lady Madeleine Sinclair / The Spey in Spate / The Duke of Perth" 3.09 (trad. / J.S. Skinner / trad.)
 "The Hieland Sodger" (*), (**) & (****) 3.34 (trad.)
 "The Streaker/The Wee Man from Skye/The Irish Washer Wife" 4.06

Side B : 21:08
 "The Arran Boat / The Canty Auld Man / Drummond Castle" 5.29 (trad.)
 "The Lothian Hairst" (**) 3.31 (trad.)
 "The Barngann Gil" 2.52 (trad.)
 "Mormond Braes" (***) 5.17 (trad.)
 "Cherish the Ladìes / The Rambling Pitchfork" 3.59 (trad.)

Personnel

Battlefield Band
Brian McNeill: voice (**), guitar, fiddle, concertina, mandolin, viola
Jamie McMenemy: voice (***), mandolin, banjo, fiddle, Irish flute
John Gahagan: voice (****), Irish flute, whistle, concertina, bones
Alan Reid: voice (*), organ, guitar, piano, accordion

Guest musicians
David John Munro: Uilleann pipes
Ian McDonald: Scottish Highland pipes
Angus McGregor: Northumbrian pipes

References

Battlefield Band albums
1978 albums